Port of Savona is a port in Savona, Italy. It is the fourth cruise port by number of passengers in Italy, with 1,300,000 people in 2013. Adjacent to the historic centre of Savona, 
the port of Savona has been active from the Middle Ages and has always been crucial for the economy of the regional capital and its hinterland. A major terminal for ferries, there are ferry links to Corsica and Sardinia through the companies Corsica Ferries and Saremar.

References

External links

Official site 

Ports and harbours of Italy
Savona